Birds described in 1888 include  bare-headed laughingthrush, Bolivian warbling finch, Borneo thrush, Damara red-billed hornbill, emperor bird-of-paradise, friendly bush warbler, Golden-backed weaver, Herald petrel, Jankowski's bunting, Palawan flycatcher, Somali bunting, Whitehead's broadbill,

Events
 Joseph Jackson Lister serves as volunteer naturalist on the surveying voyage of HMS Egeria to  the Indian Ocean.
Death of Hermann von Rosenberg

Publications
George Ernest Shelley On the Hornbills of the Ethiopian Region Ibis 1888: 47-70 online
Richard Bowdler Sharpe Further Descriptions of new Species of Birds dkcovered by Mr. John Whitehead on the Mounts of Kina Balu, Northern Borneo Ibis 1888 :383-396 
Edward Bartlett "Monograph of the Weaver Birds (Ploceidae) and Arboreal and Terrestrial Finches " five parts published in 1888–89

Ongoing events
Osbert Salvin and Frederick DuCane Godman 1879–1904. Biologia Centrali-Americana . Aves
Richard Bowdler Sharpe Catalogue of the Birds in the British Museum London,1874-98.
Anton Reichenow, Jean Cabanis,  and other members of the German Ornithologists' Society in Journal für Ornithologie online BHL
Ornis; internationale Zeitschrift für die gesammte Ornithologie.Vienna 1885-1905online BHL
The Auk online BHL
The Ibis

References

Bird
Birding and ornithology by year